Prison, also known as The Devil's Wanton in the United States, is a 1949 Swedish drama film directed by Ingmar Bergman. It is the earliest film directed by Bergman to be based on his own original screenplay.

Plot
Other than film-maker Martin Grandé, the characters are types: Thomas, a writer; his wife Sofi, who leaves him after he proposes a suicide pact; Birgitta Carolina Søderberg, a teenage prostitute; and Peter, her pimp by whom she has a child that he kills. The film presents Thomas living the scenario that Grandé and he discussed, a world that is really Hell and ruled by the Devil instead of God. He and Birgitta are unable to escape their unhappiness together.

Cast
 Doris Svedlund – Birgitta Carolina Søderberg
 Birger Malmsten – Thomas
 Eva Henning – Sofi
 Hasse Ekman – Martin Grandé
 Stig Olin – Peter
 Irma Christenson – Linnéa
 Anders Henrikson – Paul
 Marianne Löfgren – Mrs. Bohlin
  – Anna
 Curt Masreliez – Alf
 Britta Holmberg – Birgitta's Mother in Dream (voice)

Production
Producer Lorens Marmstedt agreed to finance the filming of Bergman's experimental screenplay, which the director said was in large part exploring the question, "Is earth Hell?" Filming, on a very low budget of approximately $30,000, took place over only 18 days, using an Expressionist style of cinematography; characterisation is minimal and the acting flat, in keeping with the emphasis on existential symbolism. At one point, in further distancing, Thomas and Birgitta watch a ridiculous silent film together.

References

External links

1949 films
Films directed by Ingmar Bergman
Films with screenplays by Ingmar Bergman
Swedish black-and-white films
1940s Swedish-language films
1949 drama films
Swedish drama films
1940s Swedish films